Langelurillus orbicularis is a jumping spider species in the genus Langelurillus that lives in Zimbabwe. The species was first described in 2008.

References

Salticidae
Endemic fauna of Zimbabwe
Spiders described in 2008
Spiders of Africa
Taxa named by Wanda Wesołowska